Khalkhal (Khalkhāl; formerly and local, Herowabad, Azerbaijani:
The majority of population speaks Azeri. At the 2006 census, its population was 38,521 in 9,619 households. The following census in 2011 counted 41,165 people in 11,213 households. The latest census in 2016 showed a population of 39,304 people in 11,501 households.

Etymology and history 
According to Vladimir Minorsky, the name Khalkhāl may indicate a connection with the ancient Kharkhar kingdom, which existed somewhere in the eastern Zagros Mountains in Neo-Assyrian times.

The 14th-century author Hamdallah Mustawfi listed Khalkhal in his Nuzhat al-Qulub as forming part of the tuman of Ardabil. He described it as "formerly a fair-sized town" that had declined to a mere village by his time. He wrote that Khalkhal had succeeded the earlier city of Firuzabad as the capital of its province after Firuzabad itself had declined. Mustawfi wrote that the Khalkhal province comprised about 100 villages and had four districts: Khāmidah-Bīl, Sajasrūd, Anjīlābād, and Mīsjīn. It was assessed for a tax value of 30,000 dinars. Water from a spring on a nearby mountain powered two watermills, which provided enough irrigation for the surrounding fields. Mustawfi said its pastures were "excellent" and hunting grounds were "numerous and well-stocked with game" and wrote that the district was known for producing yogurt (māst) that was "so thick it has to be cut with a knife, as though it were cheese".

See also 

 Lerd Village

 Khalkhal Khanate

References 

Khalkhal County

Cities in Ardabil Province

 Towns and villages in Khalkhal County

Populated places in Ardabil Province

Populated places in Khalkhal County